was a Japanese video game company founded in 1988. Quest is best known for its critically acclaimed tactical role-playing game series Ogre Battle.

In 1990 Quest was merged with the company Bothtec, the latter focusing on the development of personal computer software. Bothtec was best known for the 1986 action-adventure video game Relics, and the licensed games based on the Legend of the Galactic Heroes series. The companies were separated in 1997; as an independent company Bothtec Inc. remained a development partner of Quest and continued operation until being dissolved in 2009.

In 1995, key members Yasumi Matsuno, Hiroshi Minagawa, and Akihiko Yoshida left Quest to join Square, where they developed Final Fantasy Tactics and Vagrant Story, and have worked on Final Fantasy XII as part of Square Enix. In 2002, Quest was purchased by Square; and the acquisition reunited some of Quest's developers with their former colleagues. These former Quest staff continued to work on the Final Fantasy Tactics sequels Final Fantasy Tactics Advance and Final Fantasy Tactics A2, while the Ogre series creator Yasumi Matsuno left the company in 2005. Matsuno later reunited with his former team to write and design for the 2010 remake of Tactics Ogre on a freelance basis.

List of games

See also
 Atlus USA
 Square Co.

References

External links
archived company page
Quest company profile at IGN

Square (video game company)
Video game companies established in 1988
Video game companies disestablished in 2003
Defunct video game companies of Japan
Software companies based in Tokyo
Japanese companies established in 1988
Japanese companies disestablished in 2003